The Puppet Masters is a 1951 science fiction novel by American writer Robert A. Heinlein, in which American secret agents battle parasitic invaders from outer space. It was originally serialized in Galaxy Science Fiction (September, October, and November 1951).

The novel evokes a sense of paranoia and Heinlein repeatedly makes explicit the analogy between the mind-controlling parasites and the Communist Russians, echoing the prevailing Second Red Scare in the United States. George Stubbins noted "Two particularly disturbing scenes in  The Puppet Masters—the one in which members of the President's privately created Security Service hold at gunpoint the entire membership of both Houses of Congress and proceed to search out the traitors among therm, and that in which armed vigilantes roam the streets in search of traitors and shoot to death with impunity anyone they suspect of being such. Both scenes make sense in the context of the book's Science Fictional setting, and both are highly scary if applied to real American life."

The book takes up the then common theme of sightings of flying saucers, the plot assuming that the "saucers" seen in the 1950s were part of a preliminary reconnaissance of Earth, carried out by the extraterrestrials in preparation for a full-fledged invasion sixty years later.

Background
The novel starts in 2007. Following a nuclear war between the Soviet Union and the Western Bloc, which left both sides battered but unbroken, both sides return to a state of Cold War. Washington, DC and other US cities devastated in nuclear strikes had been completely rebuilt. The Soviet Union and China remain a single bloc dominated by Moscow, and the sharp Sino-Soviet split of the late 1950s never happened.

Social customs have changed somewhat, in a way typical for Heinlein's fiction (i.e. having become more liberal, such as marriage contracts being possible with fixed terms, etc.) and ray guns and personal flying cars are commonplace. "Slug throwing guns" remain in possession of some private citizens, but are considered obsolete by professionals. Space stations exist and colonies have been established on the planet Venus (depicted, as common in science fiction of the time, as a tropical planet habitable by humans).

Space technology is far more advanced than in the actual first decade of the 21st century. For example, in the last scene, a space warship is sent on a twelve-year trip to Titan, with not only life-support for a large crew, but also enough armaments—presumably nuclear—to confront an entire world on its own.

However, communications satellites have not been thought of, and television broadcasts are still limited to line-of-sight, as they were at the time of writing. This is of critical importance to the plot. The territory of the United States is divided into numerous transmission blocks, which receive television broadcasts from their neighbors and relay them onwards. When the invaders seize one of these blocks, they effectively control all communications within it and can isolate its inhabitants from the outside world, deny the central government any access to them, and consolidate control at their leisure.

The current president—on his second term—had established directly upon being first elected a new intelligence agency, known as the Section. Its creation was never authorized by Congress and its existence is kept secret, being funded by sums diverted from innocuous sounding items in the budget. It has a disguised underground headquarters in Washington, D.C. and a network of similarly disguised branch offices around the US. Unlike the clearly demarked spheres of the FBI and CIA, the Section carries out extensive espionage in Soviet territory, but also conducts operations inside the United States. If ordered to, its agents are ready to shoot and kill American citizens on US soil. The Section's Director, who had been the president's campaign manager, is universally called "The Old Man". Only gradually does the reader learn that he is the protagonist's actual father.

Plot

In the summer of 2007, Earth is under clandestine attack.  Slug-like creatures, arriving in flying saucers, are attaching themselves to people's backs, taking control of their victims' nervous systems, and manipulating those people as puppets.  The Old Man, the head of a clandestine national security agency called the Section, goes to Des Moines, Iowa, with Sam and Mary, two of his best agents, to investigate a flying saucer report, but much more seriously the ominous disappearance of the six agents sent previously. They discover that "the slugs" are steadily taking over Des Moines, but they cannot convince the US president to declare an emergency.

Sam takes two other agents and returns to Des Moines to get more evidence of the invasion.  They fail and are forced to flee quickly, but in the confusion, a slug gains control of one of the agents.  Back in Washington the team discovers the slug and captures it, but later it escapes and attaches itself to Sam, using Sam's skills and knowledge to make a clean escape.

Thoroughly under control, Sam uses the Constitution Club—whose membership includes many important members of the city's political elite—to gain more hosts for the slugs. The Old Man captures him, takes him to Section's new headquarters, and coerces Sam into allowing himself to be taken by the slug again. Under drug-induced hypnosis, Sam reveals that the slugs come from Titan, the sixth moon of Saturn. Being forced into a traumatic situation strains Sam's relationship with both Mary and the Old Man. Later, Sam finds that the president and Congress are ready to accept the idea that the United States has been infiltrated, and they pass a law that requires people to go naked to demonstrate that they are not carrying slugs.

As the Army prepares a counterattack in the most heavily infested areas, Sam goes alone to Kansas City to get an estimate of the number of slugs involved. There he learns that he can kill a slug by crushing it with his hand.  He also discovers that the slugs reproduce through fission—which means that there are far more of them than the Army realized when making its plans, and therefore the plan is doomed to failure.  Escaping from the city, he returns to Washington too late to stop the operation, which fails; the invading soldiers are either killed or captured by the slugs, who thus gain control of a corps of trained combat soldiers.

After a short leave, during which he and Mary get married and have a brief happy honeymoon—rudely interrupted by a slug that seems to have been targeting Sam for repossession. Recalled to ugly reality, Sam and Mary return to work. Together with the Old Man, they go to Pass Christian, Mississippi, to inspect a flying saucer that had made a bad landing.  Inside the alien ship, Mary is overwhelmed by repressed memories from the time she was a child on Venus and had been possessed by a slug. The slug had died from Nine-day Fever, a deadly disease native to Venus, showing that the disease kills slugs faster than their human hosts.

Adopting biological warfare, the authorities infect unsuspecting slugs with Nine-day Fever, then allow them to escape, having discovered they will transmit the disease to others. Several carefully timed days later, thousands of volunteers are parachuted into enemy-held territory to administer the cure to those people whose slugs have died. Sam and the Old Man join the effort in Jefferson City, Missouri, but the Old Man is possessed by the last healthy slug in the city, and he knocks Sam out.

Sam regains consciousness in an air-car that the Old Man is flying to the Yucatán, where the slug intends to restart its effort to conquer humanity.  With the car on autopilot, the Old Man slumps over the steering wheel and the slug begins to fission into two so that it can possess both the Old Man and Sam.  In desperation, Sam kicks the controls, causing the air-car to accelerate so sharply that the Old Man is slammed back against the seat forcefully enough to crush the slug. The air-car's emergency system mitigates the resulting crash, enabling Sam and the Old Man to survive.

Some years later, Sam and Mary board a spaceship headed for Saturn to take the offensive. Sam expresses the hope that a way would be found to save the small elf-like hosts whom the slugs enslaved.

Characters
 Sam, born Elihu Nivens, is the classic Heinlein hero, multi-talented, independent, fiercely loyal to friends and an implacable enemy to foes. He is thirtyish, but has changed appearance so many times even he has doubts as to how he originally looked.
 Mary, born Allucquere in a religious commune in Antarctica before growing up on Venus, is Heinlein's classic heroine.  She is beautiful, red-headed, hard-nosed and brilliant. Sam describes her as having the "real redheaded saurian bony structure to her skull". Her professional exterior conceals psychological scars from her encounter with the slugs as a child. Only the Old Man knows the truth about her, thanks to the deep hypnotic analysis that all agents have to undergo.
 The Old Man, born Andrew Nivens, is the head of a top secret government agency that he wishes did not have to exist, doing his job reluctantly because nobody else would do it properly. He represents the third of Heinlein's favorite types of character, the "wise, grumpy old man".  He is the first in the line that includes Jubal Harshaw, Professor Bernardo de la Paz, Johann Sebastian Bach Smith, "Kettle Belly" Baldwin, and the later life of Lazarus Long. (Lazarus Long's grandfather, who has a major role in the later part of Time Enough for Love, is particularly similar in character to "The Old Man".)

Alternative version
Heinlein's original version of the novel was 96,000 words, and was cut to about 60,000 words for both the 1951 book version and the serialization in Galaxy Science Fiction. For the Galaxy version, editor H. L. Gold also did extensive rewriting, to which Heinlein strenuously objected.

In 1990, two years after Heinlein's death, an expanded version was published with the consent of his widow, Virginia Heinlein. This edition contained material that had been cut from the original published version, because the book was deemed to be too long and controversial for the market in 1951. The uncut version seemed more risqué in 1951 than it did decades later. For example, in the uncut version the book begins with Sam waking up in bed with a blonde whom he had casually picked up the evening before, without even bothering to learn her name; the older version omitted all mention of her. The 1951 version does mention that men possessed by the invaders lost all sexual feeling—an essential element in the early parts of the plot; the original publisher completely cut out a reference to the "puppet masters" later discovering human sexuality and embarking upon wild orgies, broadcast live on television in the areas under their control.

Reception
Boucher and McComas characterized The Puppet Masters as "a thunderously exciting melodrama of intrigue", noting that Heinlein displayed "not only his usual virtues of clear logic, rigorous detail-work, and mastery of indirect exposition", but also unexpected virtues like "a startling facility in suspense devices [and] a powerful ingenuity in plotting". P. Schuyler Miller, noting that the novel's "climactic situations seem to be telegraphed", suggested that Heinlein presented his background situations so effectively that readers solve the story's mysteries more quickly than Heinlein allowed his characters to. In his "Books" column for The Magazine of Fantasy & Science Fiction, Damon Knight selected the novel as one of the 10 best SF books of the 1950s.

The book was also reviewed in the  15 June 1951 issue of Kirkus Reviews.  The reviewer wrote

The recurrent enigma of the flying saucer is finally solved when an aerial pieplate is caught with its exhaust down by the F.B.I. of 2007.  Hero Sam penetrates the contaminated area, brings a 'master' back—a gelatinous gray mass which attaches itself to a soldier's body and controls his thought processes.  Sam and his girl spot further landings, plan a counter campaign and eventually are able to rid the solar system of its parasites.  Exciting, even if it exacts a strong stomach.

Adaptations 
The Brain Eaters, a 1958 science fiction film directed by Bruno VeSota, bore a number of similarities to Heinlein's novel. Heinlein sued the film's producers, including Executive Producer Roger Corman, for plagiarism, asking $150,000 in damages. The case was settled out of court for $5,000, which included Heinlein's stipulation that his name not be used on screen or in any way with the production. The case halted actor John Payne's intention of producing a film based on Heinlein's novel.

The theme of the novel is echoed in "The Invisibles", an episode of The Outer Limits aired in 1964, and also in "Operation -- Annihilate!", the last episode of the first season of Star Trek in 1967. Similarly, in the story line begun in the Star Trek: The Next Generation episode "Coming of Age" and completed in "Conspiracy", aliens from a faraway sector invade the bodies of high-ranking Starfleet admirals in an attempt to compromise the command structure and spearhead an invasion of Earth.

The novel was adapted, with some plot and character changes, into the 1994 film of the same name.

Influence 
The Body Snatchers by Jack Finney (1954) takes up a similar premise of extraterrestrials taking over the bodies of humans. Also in the plot of the 1956 What Mad Universe by Fredric Brown—as in that of Puppet Masters—police and vigilantes ruthlessly shoot down anyone suspected of being controlled by the book's invaders from space.

Kenneth Von Gunden's novel Star Spawn takes up the basic premise of The Puppet Masters and transfers it to a Medieval setting.  Extraterrestrial parasites able to take over the bodies of humans and control them invade Medieval England and embark on conquering it, castle by castle—and are eventually foiled by the highly resourceful Friar Gregory and his friend Sir Morrough the Knight.

Citations

General and cited sources 
 Clute, John, and David Pringle. "Heinlein, Robert A." The Encyclopedia of Science Fiction. Eds. John Clute, David Langford, Peter Nicholls and Graham Sleight. Gollancz, 22 Oct. 2014. Accessed 27 Oct. 2014.
 Holdstock, Robert, ed., Encyclopedia of Science Fiction, London: Cathay Books, p. 109, 1978.
 Tuck, Donald H. (1974). The Encyclopedia of Science Fiction and Fantasy. Chicago: Advent. p. 215. .
 Warren, Bill. Keep Watching the Skies: American Science Fiction Films of the Fifties, 21st Century Edition. Jefferson, North Carolina: McFarland & Company, 2009. .

External links
 
 
 The Puppet Masters as serialized in Galaxy parts 1, 2, and 3 at the Internet Archive

1951 American novels
1951 science fiction novels
Alien invasions in novels
American novels adapted into films
American science fiction novels
Doubleday (publisher) books
Fiction about mind control
Fiction about trans-Neptunian objects
Fiction set in 2007
Fiction set on Titan (moon)
Novels by Robert A. Heinlein
Novels first published in serial form
Novels set in Iowa
Works originally published in Galaxy Science Fiction